On the American video-sharing website YouTube, "Tajdar-e-Haram" sung by Atif Aslam became first Pakistani music video to cross 100 million views. "Zaroori Tha" sung by Rahat Fateh Ali Khan became first Pakistani music video to reach 500 million views as well as first video to complete 1 billion views on 3 January 2021. "Mere Rashk-e-Qamar" by Junaid Asghar became second video to garner over 500 million views. This is the list of most-viewed Pakistani music videos on YouTube.

Billion View Club
Zaroori Tha is the first ever Pakistani music video to complete a billion views on YouTube. It completed 1 billion views on 8 January 2021. Rahat Fateh Ali Khan became the first Pakistani artist to garner over a billion views.

Top videos 
The following table lists the most-viewed Pakistani videos on YouTube with their view count, uploader, artist, language and upload date.

See also 
 List of most-viewed YouTube videos
 Pakistani pop music
 Pakistani rock
 Music of Pakistan

References 

Lists of YouTube videos
Dynamic lists
Pakistani music
Internet in Pakistan
Pakistani music videos